CatDog is an American animated television series created by Peter Hannan for Nickelodeon. The series follows the life of orange-yellow conjoined brothers of different species, with one half of the resultant animal being a cat and the other a dog. Nickelodeon produced the series from Burbank, California. The first episode aired on April 4, 1998, following the 1998 Kids' Choice Awards, before the show officially premiered in October of that year. Similarly, the Season 2 episode "Fetch" was shown in theaters in 1998 before airing on television.

The series ended on June 15, 2005, after a total of four seasons and 66 aired episodes over seven years, plus two produced episodes never aired. It was produced by Nickelodeon Animation Studio and Peter Hannan Productions, and was released on DVD in Region 1 by Shout! Factory.

Two animation studios, Saerom Animation and Rough Draft Studios through Rough Draft Korea, worked on the animation for the show.

Premise
The series revolves around Cat and Dog, a conjoined twin of a cat and a dog, who share the same body with no tail or hind legs. Although they are best friends and brothers, they have very different personalities, similar to "The Odd Couple" and the original Looney Tunes shorts, mixed with elements of Laurel and Hardy, Abbott and Costello, and fellow Nicktoon Ren and Stimpy. Cat is very cultured, while Dog is very fun-loving. Dog enjoys chasing garbage trucks, cars, and exploring – many things that Cat does not want to be involved with. Dog enjoys eating at fast-food restaurants (such as Taco Depot), whereas Cat does not. The series takes place in Nearburg, a town dominated by anthropomorphic animals and the occasional humanoid.

Episodes

Characters

Main

 CatDog (voiced by Jim Cummings and Tom Kenny respectively) are a conjoined cat and dog sibling. CatDog's conjoined body is very stretchy and flexible. Cat is the smarter and more cunning and Dog is the more happy-go-lucky and more gullible. Cat often devises plans to trick Dog into getting what he wants, such as making Dog smarter in an attempt to have more in common with him, or having him win a dog sledding contest by training him in a very hard and militaristic manner, and usually, as a result of his greediness and selfishness, these schemes all blow up in his face. Dog is the source of clumsiness. Dog is an American Foxhound. He is extremely ambitious when Cat or any other character convinces him to take on a task, diving right into it with full force and energy. With his brains and constant ridiculing from many other characters, Cat is the more defensive and short tempered of the two. Dog is the typical loyal dog and is easily convinced. He is quite gullible and will believe everything he is told. His attention span is very short and he is easily distracted by balls, garbage trucks, bones, food, and his overactive imagination. Because of his more simple nature, Dog usually is the one who gets the pair into trouble. Not paying attention to Cat's warnings, his actions almost always end up with some severe consequences. Despite this, in many of the episodes, it is shown that Dog is usually the more popular and athletic of the two. Cat has a "crush" on Shriek. In one episode, Cat admits his love for Shriek and kisses her after Shriek kisses Dog and tells him she loves him (only to wind up getting pounded by the aggressive poodle). Cat desires fame and fortune and tends to go to excessive lengths in order to gain them. He is intelligent and enjoys reading, gardening, and listening to classical music. He is somewhat uptight and believes strongly in being polite and neat. He is a stickler for cleanliness and, like many cats, hates water. Dog is often distracted with chasing shadows and chasing after tennis balls, and loves eating garbage. Much to the neat-freakish Cat's dismay, Dog leaves a mess everywhere he goes. Despite his sophisticated personality, Cat also has a dark side. Whenever he snaps, he becomes a ruthless, psychopathic maniac of whom even the Greasers are scared, once they see what he is capable of doing (especially his stress-induced, superhuman strength, evident in one episode when he destroyed the Greasers' monster truck with a single punch).

Recurring
 Winslow Thelonious Oddfellow (voiced by Carlos Alazraqui) is a blue tailless mouse that lives in CatDog's house in the hole in the wall. Winslow speaks with a typical Brooklyn accent. Winslow is always full of wisecracks about anything and everything. He is very sneaky and underhanded with CatDog, especially with Cat. Winslow and Cat do not get along very well at all, because he is always getting Cat in trouble. However, it was eventually revealed that Winslow may be afraid of Cat, because Cat tried to eat him once. Dog, however, does not mind Winslow and is friendly with him. Deep down, he has a very big heart and loves CatDog and at some point acts as CatDog's conscience and guidance for living in society, but acts out against them. His catchphrase is "What are you? Nuts?".
 The Greaser Dogs are a street gang of three tough dogs named Cliff, Shriek and Lube, who act no differently from school playground bullies, picking on anyone either weaker or different from them, usually with a "pounding". They pick on CatDog (mostly Cat) because of their freakish nature. Dog sometimes gets along with them because he is also a canine. They initiated him into the gang after he had proven his worth. The Greaser Dogs also have a fear of ticks, which renders them helpless in almost any situation. The name Greasers is a reference to the greaser subculture.
 Clifford Maurice "Cliff" Feltbottom (voiced by Tom Kenny): The leader of the Greasers. He is a bulldog that wears a black jacket with a picture of a dead cat on the back of it. He is very short-tempered and speaks similarly to Winslow with a Brooklyn accent only not as high. He got a taste of his own medicine when Eddie was accidentally glued to his jacket, which turned them into "Squirrel Dog". Once this happened, Shriek and Lube kicked him out of the Greasers because now he was a "two-headed freak." Cliff learned the pain of being an outcast and what CatDog go through. However, once he was free of Eddie, he returned to his old bullying ways and rejoined the Greasers. In the episode "Beware of Cliff", when he is trapped under a massive weight for several days, he made a solemn vow never to bully anyone (especially CatDog, despite Cat's suspicions) again should he escape this fate, though it did not last very long because he got trapped again under a falling tree and later wanted to pound them again. Later episodes reveal softer sides of Cliff, such as his love for ballet and cashmere. Two episodes say that he was not an only child; the only proof is a niece and a nephew. Despite being the leader of the Greasers, he got banned from the group once, and he got pounded by Shriek and Lube for attacking them in one episode (he was protecting Catdog from them because of a vow to never bully them again).
 Shriek DuBois (voiced by Maria Bamford): The only girl in the Greasers and possibly the smartest of the group. She is a tiny yellow poodle, with a squeaky voice with a slight raspy quality to it. Shriek has blonde, poofy hair and wears a green shirt with the letter "S" on it. Though she is as tough and loyal as the other two, she harbors a secret crush on Dog, who is unaware of this. Shriek will not hit Dog, but will only hit Cat. In the episode "Rich Shriek, Poor Shriek" it is revealed that she came from a rich family, but she despised the posh life, and so she left home and became a Greaser. Also, in the episode "Back to School" Shriek is shown to have a niece named Squeak, who greatly resembles her.
 Ignatius "Lube" Catfield-McDog (voiced by Carlos Alazraqui): A hound, he is the slowest and sweetest one of the group. He will forget what he has been saying and slur his speech. He is the most loyal of the three Greasers. Despite his dimwitted nature, Lube is musically talented and is fluent in Spanish. In one episode, he rolls up his right trouser and takes off a wooden leg, although he is consistently shown with both regular legs. He also works part-time as a mechanic. His parents, a cat mother and a dog father, appeared in "CatDog and the Great Parent Mystery" and they said that Lube got separated from them a long time ago. Also, Lube is shown to have a sister, who tries to marry Cat.  In another episode, his real name is revealed to be Ignatius, which Cliff makes fun of relentlessly. He also has a nephew which appeared in an episode where cat went back to school
 Rancid Rabbit (voiced by Billy West) is a Californian rabbit and the stereotypical authority figure. He had his job titles like police officer, life guard, prison guard, firefighter, boss of various businesses, principal, president, mayor, Egyptian pharaoh, doctor, TV host, contest judge, store and Taco Depot manager, etc. In one episode, he appears as a principal at a school and, at the end, as a police officer. When Cat asks him about this, he never receives an answer (because Rancid doesn't want to hear it). Rancid hates CatDog and will go out of his way to punish them or force them to work for him, abusing his power to the fullest degree. Rancid takes advantage of CatDog as much as he can by deceiving them into buying his products or pushing them to do his bidding in a job. He does whatever it takes to take their money or benefit himself in any way. Rancid owns a mall called the Mall of Malls, and has a selfish and spoiled niece named Rancine. Rancid also has a Russian-accented female cousin named Rotten who lives in Farburg.
 Eddie the Squirrel (voiced by Dwight Schultz) is a Greaser wannabe with little red pieces of paper taped to the side of his head to look like red sideburns in hopes to be more like Cliff. He is always bruised up from getting punched, and from being used as a birdie in badminton, or a football. He wants to be an official Greaser very badly, but sadly lacks their number one requirement: being a dog.
 Randolph Grant (voiced by Billy West) is a trendy, suave cat who has an accent like Cary Grant. He will try anything once, as long as it's terribly exciting and attention-getting. Randolph appears to be like a celebrity in his lifestyle. In "All About Cat," Randolph was hosting the musical awards banquet. In "The Lady is a Shriek" Randolph is the proud owner of "Randolph's Charm School and House of Beauty", to help turn girls into beautiful women with poise and etiquette. Randolph is essentially a trend-setting, rich and famous cat. His catchphrase is "And I love it!"
 Tallulah Headbank (voiced by Maria Bamford) is an actress on whom Cat has an enormous crush. CatDog first met Tallulah during the musical "Abe Lincoln Superstar". Since then, she has become a major celebrity and good friend of Randolph's. Tallulah is forever searching for her soul mate, who would be "as loyal as a dog and as clever as a cat, who will take [her] in his arms." Her name is a parody of Tallulah Bankhead.
 Mean Bob (voiced by Billy West), a fictional super-hero, is Dog's hero. Dog is an expert on Mean Bob, having watched his movies, played his video games and with his toys.
 Lola Caricola (voiced by Nika Futterman) is a Mexican Whip-poor-will introduced in the third season. She is a zoologist, and CatDog's next-door neighbor. She gained a love of zoology while wrangling bulls on her family's ranch. Her catchphrase is "Unbelievable!"
 The Ingrid Twins (voiced by Laraine Newman) are a pair of Swedish twin cat sisters whom Cat has a crush on. The light blue twin wears her hair in pigtails and wears a red leotard, while the gray twin wears her hair in a short bob and wears a blue leotard. In "Armed and Dangerous" one of the twins was Cat's pen pal. Cat tries to impress the twins so that they can go on a date with him, but they seem more interested in Dog. They also have an interest in dating TV stars and movie stars.
 Mervis Pantry (a pig) and Dunglap Daniels (a weasel) (voiced by John Kassir) are CatDog's male best friends and are often used as background characters. They are rarely seen apart, and have been shown with various jobs, such as working at Taco Depot, the Kavity Krunch cereal factory, and Mervis even had a temporary run as a mailman trying to deliver CatDog's mail. Dunglap appears to be the luckier of the two due to his fortunes, like getting a promotion at a job, in contrast to Mervis's misfortunes, such as getting into an accident because of the Greasers. A running gag throughout the series is that Mervis and Dunglap can sometimes be seen fighting. They both have nerdy personalities and often feel uncomfortable and nervous around the "cooler" characters, especially the Greasers.
 Mr. Cornelius Sunshine (voiced by Billy West) is a green-skinned, shirtless humanoid creature with a thin, once-coiled tail and no apparent emotions who has a monotone voice and demeanor very similar to the actor Ben Stein. His name is ironically the very opposite of his personality, and he often nods off and falls asleep in the middle of doing things, such as performing a (very unengaging) magic act. His sardonic and pessimistic personality may be Dog's fault, since Sunshine experiences stress of being hunted as a dustman by Dog since his early years in the job. Very little is known about him, and the ambiguity of his species is touched upon in "CatDog Catcher" when Rancid Rabbit starts arresting everyone for not having licenses: Dog does not have a dog license, Lola does not have a bird license, and so on; but when Rancid captures Sunshine, he says, "You're under arrest for not having a...not having a...not having a license!" Thus it is apparent that not even the characters in the series know what he is. Mr. Sunshine's first name is Cornelius. He was originally envisioned as a squirrel during the early planning stages.

Production
The series, created by Peter Hannan, was developed as the next Nicktoons production and produced from Nickelodeon Animation Studio in Burbank, California. Hannan served as executive producer. This was part of Nickelodeon's $350 million investment in original animation over the next five years after the series' inception.

Albie Hecht, Nickelodeon's senior vice president of worldwide productions, said that the creators planned for the series to "really play off of kids' sympathies" by portraying the characters as experiencing "the worst of both worlds". Hannan said CatDog was inspired by watching neighborhood cats and dogs occasionally fight each other, and thought that it would be great to make conjoined twins Cat and Dog to see how both of the animals would fare against other things. The idea of them being conjoined twins came from Hannan watching several news stories on TV about conjoined twins living a normal life conjoined together. Both aspects he claimed, initially developed the idea of CatDog.

The title characters were originally envisioned as a two-headed superhero called "CatDog Man".

Release

Broadcast
The series originally aired on Nickelodeon in the US from 1998 to 2004, and aired reruns from 2005 to 2007. It was subsequently aired on Nicktoons (2002–2011) and NickSplat (2013-2018) and streams on Paramount+ (2020-present). In the UK and Ireland, the series was broadcast on Nickelodeon (1998–2005), Channel 4 (1999-2007) and Nicktoons (2002–13). In Canada, the series was broadcast on Nickelodeon (2009–2019) and on YTV (1998–2006). In Australia and New Zealand, the series was broadcast on Nickelodeon (1998–2015). In Japan, the series was broadcast on Nickelodeon (1999–2009) and on TV Asahi (1999–2006). In Middle East, the series was broadcast on Nickelodeon Arabia (2008–2011) and on MBC 3 (2014–2015). In March 2021, the series was added along with other various Nicktoons and Nickelodeon shows onto Paramount+.

Home media and digital download releases
Two VHS tapes of the series were released by Paramount Home Video on March 30, 1999. Together Forever contains the episodes "Dog Gone", "Flea or Die", "Diamond Fever", "CatDog's End" and "Work Force" with a bonus short "Cat-Diggety Dog" and CatDog vs. The Greasers contains the episodes "Siege on Fort CatDog", "Squirrel Dog", "Full Moon Fever", "Shriek Loves Dog" and "All You Need is Lube".

In 2010, Nickelodeon contracted Amazon.com's CreateSpace service arm to produce DVD sets of CatDog and other Nickelodeon shows exclusively for sale on Amazon. The DVDs were "manufactured-on-demand" DVD-Rs to match orders. The series is also available for download on Amazon's InstantVideo service. From 2011 to 2013, Shout! Factory released the series on DVD via several season sets, and a proper complete series set was released on December 9, 2014.

♦ – Shout! Factory select title sold exclusively through Shout's online store.

The complete series is also available for download in the iTunes Store, and streaming on Paramount+.

Reception

Critical
The series was reviewed by Common Sense Media with a score 2/5 stars, advised for children 7 and up.

Awards and nominations
In 1998, the series was nominated for an Annie Award for Outstanding Individual Achievement for Writing in an Animated Television Production, for "Dog Gone". The recipients would have been Derek Drymon, Robert Porter and Peter Hannan.

At the 1999 Kids' Choice Awards, the show was nominated for Favorite Cartoon. However, it lost to Rugrats. It did so again in the 2000 Kids' Choice Awards.

Video games
 CatDog: Quest for the Golden Hydrant (1999, PC)
 CatDog: Saving Mean Bob (1999, PlayStation, cancelled)
 Nicktoons Racing (as playable characters)
 Nickelodeon Party Blast (Seen but not playable characters)
 Nicktoons: Attack of the Toybots (Seen but not playable characters)
 Nicktoons MLB (Seen but not playable characters)
 Super Brawl Universe (as playable characters)
 Nickelodeon Kart Racers 2: Grand Prix (as playable characters)
 Nickelodeon All-Star Brawl (as playable characters)
 Nickelodeon Extreme Tennis (as playable characters)
 Nickelodeon Kart Racers 3: Slime Speedway (as playable characters)

References

External links

 
 Welcome to CatDog's 1st Fan Site – includes various interview from members of cast and crew

1990s Nickelodeon original programming
2000s Nickelodeon original programming
1998 American television series debuts
2005 American television series endings
1990s American animated television series
2000s American animated television series
1990s American children's comedy television series
2000s American children's comedy television series
American children's animated comedy television series
English-language television shows
Animated television series about brothers
Animated television series about cats
Animated television series about dogs
Animated television series about twins
Television series by Rough Draft Studios
Nicktoons
Fictional cats
Fictional dogs
Fictional hybrids
Comedy franchises